John B. Ryan (born 18 February 1962 in Ashton-under-Lyne, Lancashire, England), is an English footballer who played as a left back in the Football League. Equally adept at left full back or left wing, is still fondly remembered at Boundary Park where he was a firm fan favourite.

Ryan transferred to Sheffield Wednesday in exchange for Pat Heard plus £40,000.

References

External links

1962 births
Living people
Footballers from Ashton-under-Lyne
English footballers
Association football defenders
England under-21 international footballers
Oldham Athletic A.F.C. players
Newcastle United F.C. players
Sheffield Wednesday F.C. players
Mansfield Town F.C. players
Chesterfield F.C. players
Rochdale A.F.C. players
Bury F.C. players
Stalybridge Celtic F.C. players
Radcliffe F.C. players
English Football League players